A greasy spoon is a small, cheap restaurant – either an American diner or coffee shop, or a British or Irish cafe – typically specializing in fried foods. The term greasy spoon has been used in the United States since at least the 1920s and is used throughout the United Kingdom and Ireland. According to the Oxford English Dictionary, the term greasy spoon originated in the United States and is now used in various English-speaking countries.

The earliest appearance of the term in print (MacMillan's Magazine, 1906), refers to events of an earlier time: a restaurant in Paris was visited daily by Robert Louis Stevenson in 1874.
"...the Cremerie in the Rue Delambre, - an eating-house much frequented by artists, and familiarly known as The Greasy Spoon..."

Nicknaming cheap fried food restaurants after an unwashed spoon dates back at least to 1848: "The Gabbione [in Rome]... has withal an appearance so murky and so very far removed from cleanliness, that the Germans have bestowed upon it the apellation of the 'Dirty Spoon'."

Menu
Many typical American and Canadian greasy spoon diners focus on fried or grilled food, such as Salisbury steak, fish and chips, deep fried chicken, sausages, bacon, waffles, pancakes, Spam, fried or scrambled eggs, and omelettes. Sandwiches are also popular, including hamburgers, hot dogs, steak sandwiches, and deli meats. These are often accompanied by sides of baked beans, hash browns, toast, french fries, onion rings, coleslaw. Soups and chili con carne are generally available. Regional fare is often served. Since the 1970s, many Greek immigrants have entered the business. Coffee, iced tea, and soft drinks are the typical beverages, as alcohol is usually not offered due to the prohibitive cost of a liquor license. Pie, savouries and ice cream are popular snacks and desserts.

A typical American greasy spoon or diner may offer a full meal for a special price, sometimes called a blue-plate special. A British or Irish cafe will typically offer a "full cooked breakfast" all day. 

A greasy spoon diner is often located alongside a main road to serve passing motorists, particularly a truck stop catering particularly to truck (lorry) drivers; this is known as a transport cafe in Britain.

Popular culture
Although there are now far fewer establishments due to the dominance of corporate fast food restaurant chains, the greasy spoon diner is still nostalgic thanks to "counter service, jukeboxes and hearty comfort cuisine". The greasy spoon is a common setting in movies and TV shows.

Restaurateur and television personality Guy Fieri, on Food Network's Diners, Drive-Ins and Dives, pays visits to such diners across the United States.

See also

 Bar mleczny
 Cha chaan teng, Hong-Kong style greasy spoon
 Coney Island (restaurant)
 Dhaba, an Indian diner
 List of diners
 Lunch counter
 Mamak stall
 Meat and three
 Mickey's Diner
 Nick Tahou Hots
 Pat's Hubba Hubba
 Public house
 List of public house topics
 Salisbury House (restaurant)
 Waffle House

References

Hospitality industry in the United Kingdom
Restaurants by type